Kaitlyn Dawn Bristowe (born June 19, 1985) is a Canadian television personality best known for being a contestant on the nineteenth season of ABC's The Bachelor, and as the lead on the eleventh season of The Bachelorette. She competed on season 29 of Dancing with the Stars, with partner Artem Chigvintsev, and was declared the winner on November 23, 2020.

Early life
The daughter of a ballerina, Bristowe grew up  in Leduc, Alberta, Canada, and moved as an adult to Vancouver, British Columbia for a dance scholarship where she became a spin-class instructor.

Career

Television

The Bachelor 

Bristowe was a contestant on Chris Soules' season of The Bachelor. She placed third overall, losing to runner-up Becca Tilley and winner Whitney Bischoff.

The Bachelorette

On The Bachelor "After the Final Rose" segment, host Chris Harrison announced that season eleven would begin with two Bachelorettes, Bristowe and fellow season nineteen contestant Britt Nilsson. Bristowe became the official bachelorette of season eleven. The season ultimately ended in her engagement to contestant Shawn Booth.

Bristowe co-hosted season 17 and season 18 of The Bachelorette alongside fellow former Bachelorette Tayshia Adams.

Dancing with the Stars 
During the airing of The Bachelor: The Greatest Seasons – Ever! in June 2020, host Chris Harrison offered Bristowe a spot on the upcoming season of Dancing with the Stars, which she accepted. Previously Bristowe alleged that The Bachelor creator Mike Fleiss had blocked Bristowe from participating on the show when she was offered a spot in 2015 after her season of The Bachelorette had finished airing.

On September 2, 2020, Bristowe was announced as one of the celebrities competing on the 29th season of Dancing with the Stars. She was partnered with professional dancer Artem Chigvintsev, and on November 23, 2020, they were declared the winners of the season.

On November 8, 2021, Bristowe was announced as one of the stars joining the Dancing with the Stars Live! - 2022 Tour. She is joining other professionals on the show, including her season 29 partner, Artem. She is set to perform at 55 out of the 66 dates.

Other ventures 
Her podcast, Off the Vine with Kaitlyn Bristowe, began on May 29, 2017.  In 2019, she started her wine label Spade and Sparrows. On May 14, 2020, Bristowe released her debut single "If I'm Being Honest".

Personal life 
On November 2, 2018, Bristowe and Booth made a joint statement that they had broken up. Kaitlyn started dating Jason Tartick from Becca Kufrin's season of The Bachelorette in January 2019. They share a home together in Nashville, Tennessee, with their two golden retrievers. In September 2019, the couple starred in country singer Brett Kissel's music video for his number one hit "Drink About Me". In November 2020, the couple's dogs starred in the music video for Kissel's "A Few Good Stories" with Walk off the Earth. In May 2021, Bristowe and Tartick announced their engagement.

References

1985 births
Living people
People from Leduc, Alberta
Bachelor Nation contestants
Canadian expatriates in the United States
Dancing with the Stars (American TV series) winners
Victims of cyberbullying